The 1963 Ole Miss Rebels football team represented the University of Mississippi during the 1963 NCAA University Division football season. The Rebels were led by 17th-year head coach Johnny Vaught and played their home games at Hemingway Stadium in Oxford, Mississippi. Ole Miss were champions of the Southeastern Conference, finishing the regular season with a record of 7–0–2 (5–0–1 SEC) and ranked 7th in the final AP Poll. They were invited to the 1964 Sugar Bowl, where they lost to fellow SEC member Alabama.

Through the 2021 season, this is Ole Miss' most recent conference championship.

Schedule

Personnel

Awards
Perry Lee Dunn - 2nd Team All-SEC (AP, UPI)

References

Ole Miss
Southeastern Conference football champion seasons
Ole Miss Rebels football seasons
Ole Miss Rebels football